Polytela is a genus of moths of the family Noctuidae erected by Achille Guenée in 1852. Species are distributed across the Old World.

Description
Its eyes are hairy. The proboscis is well developed. Palpi porrect (extending forward) and roughly scaled, where the third joint is short. Antennae very simple. Thorax and abdomen without tufts and tibia without spines.

Species

 Polytela chrysospila Walker, 1865
 Polytela cliens (Felder & Rogenhofer, 1874)
 Polytela florigera Guenée, 1852
 Polytela gloriosae (Fabricius, 1775)

References

Glottulinae